Micleușeni is a commune in Strășeni District, Moldova. It is composed of two villages, Huzun and Micleușeni.

Notable people
 Vasile Bahnaru

References

Communes of Strășeni District